The Trailside Museum of Natural History is located in the historic Army Theatre at Fort Robinson State Park, three miles west of Crawford, Nebraska on U.S. Route 20.

History 

The building served as a theater and gymnasium for the Fort Robinson army post. The theater hosted many types of entertainment, including boxing matches, dances, and moving pictures. The theater was exclusively used as a gym by 1917 as automobiles and movie houses became more prevalent, allowing soldiers to seek entertainment elsewhere.

The building was acquired by the University of Nebraska in 1955 which opened the Trailside Museum at Fort Robinson in 1961. It was listed on the National Register of Historic Places in 1988, and is also part of the Fort Robinson and Red Cloud Agency historic district.

Exhibition 
The most important exhibition is a pair of 14 - foot mammoth skeletons  were found nearby. The beasts apparently locked tusks in mortal combat and starved to death as a result.

The museum exhibits the fossils of two mammoths which killed each other when the area was in an ice age. They were trapped due to their tusks and died.

Also in the museum there is a paleontological exhibition made by Mark Marcusson and Gregory Brownde. There are exhibits of animals that lived in Nebraska millions of years ago like the Daeodon or three-toed horse.

See also 
Toadstool Geologic Park

References

External links
 

Buildings and structures in Dawes County, Nebraska
Federal lands in Nebraska
Robinson
Historic district contributing properties in Nebraska
Museums in Dawes County, Nebraska
National Register of Historic Places in Dawes County, Nebraska
Protected areas of Dawes County, Nebraska
State parks of Nebraska
Theatres on the National Register of Historic Places in Nebraska
Natural history museums in Nebraska
Fossil museums
Paleontology in Nebraska